The America Zone was one of the two regional zones of the 1923 International Lawn Tennis Challenge.

For the first time, the competition would be split into two zones: the America Zone and the Europe Zone. This change was necessitated by having more than 16 teams compete for the cup (thus not fitting into one easily workable draw). The past several years had also seen a rise in the number of defaults, as teams from around the globe tried to work out the logistics of playing such an international tournament. Regional zones would help alleviate these problems.

4 teams entered the America Zone, with the winner going on to compete in the Inter-Zonal Final against the winner of the Europe Zone. Australia defeated Japan in the final, and went on to face France in the Inter-Zonal Final.

Draw

Semifinals

Hawaii vs. Australia

Canada vs. Japan

Final

Australia vs. Japan

References

External links
Davis Cup official website

Davis Cup Americas Zone
America Zone
International Lawn Tennis Challenge